The Magnolias is a historic cottage located at 115 Jefferson Street, in New Iberia, Louisiana.

Built in 1852, the house was modified in about 1920. In 1929 the entire house was moved and rotated 90 degrees, so that it faces Jefferson Street rather than Main Street.  It is set back from the street and has modern buildings on each side.  The building has a pedimented Greek Revival one-bay portico that is both massive and unusual on a four-bay house.

The house was listed on the National Register of Historic Places on December 6, 1979.

See also
National Register of Historic Places listings in Iberia Parish, Louisiana

References

New Iberia, Louisiana
Creole architecture in Louisiana
Houses on the National Register of Historic Places in Louisiana
Houses completed in 1852
Houses in Iberia Parish, Louisiana
National Register of Historic Places in Iberia Parish, Louisiana
1852 establishments in Louisiana